The Church of Saint Athanasius on Via Tiburtina is a Roman Catholic titular church in Rome, built as a parish church. It was consecrated 11 March 1961 by Cardinal Clemente Micara. On 28 June 1991 Pope John Paul II granted it a titular church as a seat for Cardinals.

The present Cardinal Priest of the Titulus San Athanasii ad viam Tiburtinam is Gabriel Zubeir Wako.

Architecture 
The structure of the church is in a Greek Cross, with four large windows, each representing respectively the Eucharistic symbols of the body and blood, Saint Athanasius, and the Holy Spirit. The main altar is semicircular, and of granite with the Last Supper in the background. Left of the altar is a picture of the eighteenth-century painting of the Assumption, and on the right is a baptismal font with travertine dome, closed by a cover bronze statue of John the Baptist.

List of Cardinal-Priests 
 Alexandru Todea (28 June 1991 – 22 May 2002)
 Gabriel Zubeir Wako (21 October 2003 – present)

References

 C. Rendina, Le Chiese di Roma, Newton & Compton Editori, Milano 2000
 C. Cerchiai, Quartiere XXI. Pietralata, in AA.VV, I quartieri di Roma, Newton & Compton Editori, Roma 2006

Atanasio a Via Tiburtina
20th-century Roman Catholic church buildings in Italy
Rome Q. XXI Pietralata